Muthukur or Muttukuru is a village and a Mandal in Nellore district in the state of Andhra Pradesh in India.

Geography
It has an average elevation of 4 meters (16 feet).

Panchayats
There are 21 panchayats in Muthukur mandal.

Muthukur Mandal Panchayat List:
Balija Palem (village)
Brahmadevam (village and panchayat)
Dammayapalem (village and panchayat)
Doruvulapem (village and panchayat)
Duvvuruvaripalem (village and panchayat)
Epuru (village and panchayat)
Krishnapatnam (village and panchayat)
Malluru (village and panchayat)
Mamidipudi (village and panchayat)
Musunurivaripalem (village and panchayat)
Muthukur Town(Panchayat and Headquarters)
Narikelapalli (village and panchayat)
Nelaturu (village and panchayat)
Pantapalem (village and panchayat)
Pathurivari Kandrigi (village and panchayat)
Pidatha Polour (village and panchayat)
Polamrajugunta (village and panchayat)
Pottempadu (village and panchayat)
Pynapuram (village and panchayat)
Tallapudi (village and panchayat)
Valluru (village and panchayat)
Varkavipudi (village and panchayat).Largest port in India Krishnapatnam located in Muthukur mandal only.

References 

Villages in Nellore district